Shitpyit is the name of the following places in Kyain Seikgyi Township, Kawkareik District, in the Kayin State of Myanmar:

Shitpyit (15°36'0"N 98°6'0"E)
Shitpyit (15°35'0"N 98°6'0"E)